Irdomatka is a rural locality (a village) and the administrative center of Irdomatskoye Rural Settlement, Cherepovetsky District, Vologda Oblast, Russia. The population was 1,056 as of 2002. There are 61 streets.

Geography 
Vaneyevo is the nearest rural locality.

References 

Rural localities in Cherepovetsky District